Issam Badda (born 10 May 1983 in Khemisset, Morocco) is a Moroccan footballer who plays as a goalkeeper. He is currently a free agent. He was part of the Moroccan squad at the 2012 Africa Cup of Nations.
At the finals, Badda was diagnosed with a form of malaria.

References

1983 births
Living people
Moroccan footballers
Morocco international footballers
2012 Africa Cup of Nations players
People from Khemisset
Ittihad Khemisset players
Association football goalkeepers